"Say You'll Stay Until Tomorrow" is a 1977 single written by Roger Greenway & Barry Mason and performed by Tom Jones.

Charts
The song was Jones's first and highest-charting country music hit. Spending ten weeks within the Top 40 of the Billboard Hot Country Singles (now Hot Country Songs) chart, "Say You'll Stay Until Tomorrow" went to number one for one week on 26 February 1977. The song also peaked at number fifteen on the Billboard Hot 100, and was Jones's last single to reach the top 40 until 1988. It was also a Number One hit in Canada, reaching the top of the RPM country and easy-listening charts. In Tom Jones's native United Kingdom, it reached number 40, and would be his last to reach the top 40 there until 1987.

Weekly charts

Year-end charts

Cover Versions
The song was recorded the same year by Slim Whitman, and was included on his album Home on the Range.

References

External links
 

1977 singles
Tom Jones (singer) songs
Songs written by Roger Greenaway
Songs written by Barry Mason
1977 songs
EMI Records singles
Epic Records singles
Number-one singles in New Zealand